Hayato Okamoto may refer to:

Hayato Okamoto (cyclist) (born 1995), Japanese cyclist
Hayato Okamoto (footballer) (born 1974), Japanese footballer